The Premio Bartolomé Hidalgo are the most important literary awards in Uruguay.

Established in 1988, they are named after Bartolomé Hidalgo, one of the founders of Gaucho literature.

Selected recipients 

Authors
 Roy Berocay
 Fernando Butazzoni
 Daniel Mella
 Susana Olaondo
 Mauricio Rosencof
 Daniel Vidart
 Circe Maia
Roy Berocay
Antonio Larreta

Works
 El misterio de la caja habladora
 El profeta imperfecto
Lava
 Por un color
 La vereda del destino

See also
 Uruguayan literature

References

Premio Bartolomé Hidalgo
1988 establishments in Uruguay
Awards established in 1988
Uruguayan literary awards